Abram Penn Staples (September 18, 1885 – March 21, 1951) was a Virginia lawyer, legislator and jurist.  He served for eleven years as the Attorney General of Virginia, and four years as a justice on the Supreme Court of Virginia.

Early and family life
Staples was born at Martinsville, Virginia in 1885 to Abram Penn Staples (1858–1913), a prominent Virginia lawyer and his wife. His grandfather, Samuel Granville Staples, was the elected clerk of the Circuit Court of Patrick County, Virginia and had signed the Articles of Secession in 1861. His uncle, Waller Redd Staples sat of the Virginia Court of Appeals from 1870–1881 and for three of those years also on the faculty of the Washington and Lee University School of Law. When young Abram was a child, his family moved to Roanoke, where he attended Roanoke High School. In 1904, because of poor health (and to facilitate his children's education), Abram Staples Sr. joined the Washington and Lee University law faculty, where he became a beloved law professor until his death in a Roanoke hospital in 1913. Meanwhile, this Abram Staples studied as an undergraduate at Washington and Lee University, and received a Bachelor of Law degree in 1908.

Career
Entering into practice at Roanoke in 1908, Staples soon made a name for himself as an exceptional lawyer.  In 1924, he was elected President of the Roanoke Bar Association and, in 1927, was elected to the Virginia Senate (a part-time position), and was re-elected in 1931.

He was appointed Attorney General of Virginia in March 1934 to fill out the term of John R. Saunders (who had died in office). He won election to that office in 1937 against Republican Gerould M. Rumble. He was reelected in 1941 and 1945.

In August 1947, the Virginia General Assembly elected Staples to the Supreme Court of Appeals of Virginia. He served on that court until he retired in January 1951, because of failing health. Staples was a member of Phi Beta Kappa, Phi Delta Phi, and Omicron Delta Kappa.

References

External links

 

1885 births
1951 deaths
Justices of the Supreme Court of Virginia
Virginia Attorneys General
Virginia state senators
Virginia lawyers
Washington and Lee University School of Law alumni
Washington and Lee University School of Law faculty
20th-century American lawyers
20th-century American judges
20th-century American politicians
People from Martinsville, Virginia